The 2016 Treviso Open was a Nine-ball pool event, and part of the Euro Tour.  The event was held between 24–26 November 2016 in the BHR Treviso Hotel  in  Treviso, Italy.

The winner was David Alcaide.  The Spaniard secured his second Euro Tour victory by a 9–6 final win against the German Joshua Filler.  Third place went to the Pole Mieszko Fortuński and the Dutch Niels Feijen who won the previous Euro Tour tournament, the 2016 Leende Open

The defending champion was the Englishman Mark Gray, who lost in the round of 16 against Marco Teutscher.

Tournament results
The event saw 163 Participants first in a Double elimination tournament. With 32 players left, the event turned into a  Single-elimination tournament.

References

External links 

 Official Website 

 Treviso Open 2016 at sixpockets.de

2016 Euro Tour events
Sports competitions in Treviso